Rezantsev may refer to:

Andrey Rezantsev (born 1965), Uzbekistani footballer
Valery Rezantsev (born 1946), Russian Greco-Roman wrestler
Yakov Rezantsev (1973–2022), Russian general